Christine 'Stine' Bosse is a Danish businesswoman.

Early life and education
Bosse gained a Masters of Law degree from the University of Copenhagen in 1987.

Career
Upon graduation, Bosse began working for TrygVesta, a Nordic insurance agency, rising up the ranks until she became an executive manager in 1999. In 2003 she was appointed CEO,  and in 2009 the Financial Times identified her as "the 22nd most influential businesswoman in the world".

The United Nations appointed Bosse as an Advocate for the Millennium Development Goals in 2010, and she left TrygVesta in 2011, becoming a professional board member and subject-matter expert. In 2015 she was appointed President of the European Movement in Denmark, taking over from Anne E. Jensen, and separately became the new Chair of the Board of BankNordik. She is also President of the Royal Danish Theatre, a Member of the Board of Allianz, a non-executive director of Aker, and serves as an adjunct professor at the University of Copenhagen in the Department of Operations Management.

Other activities
 European Council on Foreign Relations (ECFR), Member

References 

20th-century Danish businesswomen
20th-century Danish businesspeople
21st-century Danish businesswomen
21st-century Danish businesspeople
Danish chief executives
Danish women business executives
University of Copenhagen alumni
People from Lyngby-Taarbæk Municipality
1960 births
Living people